The 2022 Canadian Premier League season is the fourth season of the Canadian Premier League, the top level of Canadian soccer. Pacific FC are the defending champions, having beaten Forge FC in the 2021 final.

The regular season ran from April 7 to October 9, 2022. Each team played four games against each of the seven opponents for a total of 28 matches. Atlético Ottawa won the regular season championship on October 8, securing the club its first trophy.

The top four teams from the regular season qualified for the playoffs where they competed for the league title. Forge FC defeated Atlético Ottawa in the 2022 Final to win their third title.

Team and rule changes
The eight teams that competed in the 2021 Canadian Premier League season returned for the 2022 season. This was the last season to feature FC Edmonton and the last season before the debut of Vancouver FC in 2023.

The maximum team compensation for this season was $1.2 million split between players and coaching staff. The required spend on player compensation was $650,000 to $850,000. In 2022, the U21 player salary rule was introduced which counts financial compensation to players aged 21 or under at 50% towards the cap (up to a maximum of $100,000).

Teams

Stadiums and locations

Personnel and sponsorship

Number of teams by province or territory

Coaching changes

Regular season

Format
The regular season took place from April 7 to October 9. The schedule format is a quadruple round robin with each team playing two matches at home and two matches away against each of the seven opponents for a total of 28 games. The majority of matches were played on weekends.

Table

Results

Playoffs
The top four teams from the regular season qualified for the playoffs. The first-place team played against the fourth, and the second-place team played against the third in two-leg semifinals on October 15 and 23. The away goals rule was not used in the semifinals. The winners advanced to the CPL Final, a single match hosted by the higher-seeded team on October 30.

Bracket

Semifinals

Summary

|}

Matches

Atlético Ottawa won 3–1 on aggregate.

Forge FC won 3–2 on aggregate.

Final

Awards

Canadian Premier League Awards

Team of the Week 
The Gatorade Team of the Week is selected by OneSoccer staff.

Monthly Awards

Attendance

Statistical leaders

Top scorers

Top assists

Clean sheets

Hat-tricks

Player transfers

U Sports Draft 
The 2022 CPL–U Sports Draft was held on January 20, 2022, with Atletico Ottawa selecting José da Cunha of Cape Breton University first overall. Each team made two picks in the draft, for a total of 16 selections.

Foreign players 

Canadian Premier League teams can sign a maximum of seven international players, out of which only five can be in the starting line-up for each match. Teams are required to carry a minimum of four international players, either signed through or approved by the league's scouting partner, 21st Club. The following players were considered foreign players for the 2022 season. This list does not include Canadian citizens who represent other countries at the international level.

Players in italic denote players new to their respective clubs for the 2022 season, sorted chronologically by their announcement.

Notes

References 

 
Canadian Premier League seasons
Canadian Premier League